Martin Harold Phillips Bott  (12 July 1926 – 20 October 2018) was a British geologist and Professor in the Department of Earth Sciences at the University of Durham, England.

Education
Bott was educated at Clayesmore School in Dorset and Magdalene College, Cambridge, where he was awarded a Master of Arts degree and PhD.

Career
Bott worked throughout his academic career at the University of Durham. In 1954 he started as Turner & Newall Research Fellow. In 1956 he received an appointment as lecturer in Geophysics, was promoted to Reader in Geophysics in 1963 and in 1966 appointed Professor of Geophysics. This place he held until his retirement in 1988, interrupted only in 1970 by a year abroad at the Lamont–Doherty Geological Observatory of Columbia University.

Research
Bott dealt first with the interpretation of magnetic and gravimetric anomalies in England, including Devon and Cornwall and in the eastern Alps. In the late 1950s he began studies on the mechanism of geological disturbances, and published work on various problems in relation to the structure of the crust.

In the 1960s Bott published papers on the use of digital computation methods for solving geophysical problems and further work on the structure of the crust, regional geophysical studies in England and Ireland. In the early 1970s he published his textbook The Interior of the Earth, in which he summarised the current knowledge about the structure of the earth. In addition to theoretical work on the interpretation of magnetic and gravimetric anomalies that appeared over the next few years, he published other geophysical papers on regions such as the Faroe Islands, South Greenland and the Lesser Antilles. Even after his retirement, he remained true to his research and published numerous scientific papers and books.

Awards and honours
Bott was elected a Fellow of the Royal Society (FRS) in 1976, and was the 1992 recipient of the Wollaston Medal from the Geological Society of London. His nomination for the Royal Society reads:

Personal life
Bott was a Vice-President of Christians in Science.

He died on 20 October 2018 at the age of 92.

References

1926 births
2018 deaths
Academics of Durham University
Alumni of Magdalene College, Cambridge
English Christians
English geologists
English geophysicists
Fellows of the Royal Society
Members of the International Society for Science and Religion
People educated at Clayesmore School
Wollaston Medal winners